Guinea is divided into four natural regions with distinct human, geographic, and climatic characteristics:

Maritime Guinea (La Guinée Maritime) covers 34% of the country
 Middle Guinea (La Moyenne-Guinée) covers 20% of the country
 Upper Guinea (La Haute-Guinée) covers 38% of the country
 Forested Guinea (Guinée Forestière) covers 23% of the country, and is both forested and mountainous

Government divisions

Regions 

Guinea is divided into seven administrative regions. The national capital, Conakry, ranks as a special zone.

The capital Conakry with a population of 1,660,973 ranks as a special zone.

Prefectures 

Guinea's regions are subdivided into thirty-three prefectures and one special zone, Conakry.

Sub-prefectures 

The Communes of Guinea or sub prefectures, known in French as sous-prefectures, are the third-level administrative divisions in Guinea. As of 2009 there were 303 rural communes of Guinea and 38 urban communes, 5 of which compose the Conakry greater urban area.

See also 
 Geography of Guinea
List of regions of Guinea by Human Development Index

References 

 
Guinea
Natural regions of Africa
Guinea